Berg WMA, or Berg Water Management Area (coded: 19), Include the following major rivers: the Berg River, Diep River and Steenbras River, and covers the following Dams:

 Berg River Dam Berg River 
 Misverstand Dam Berg River 
 Lower Steenbras Dam Steenbras River 
 Upper Steenbras Dam Steenbras River 
 Voelvlei Dam Voelvlei River 
 Wemmershoek Dam Wemmers River

Boundaries 
Tertiary drainage regions G10, G21, and G22 and quaternary catchment G40A with the northern boundary following the watershed between tertiary drainage
regions G10 and G30 up to the town of Aurora. From Aurora the boundary runs directly to the coast in a westerly direction.

See also 
 Water Management Areas
 List of reservoirs and dams in South Africa
 List of rivers of South Africa

References 
 Hydrology

 
Water Management Areas